Paul Gordon may refer to:

Paul Gordon (basketball) (1927–2002), American basketball player
Paul Gordon (hurler) (born 1990), Irish hurler
Paul Gordon (composer) (born c. 1954), composer-lyricist of Jane Eyre and other musicals
Paul Gordon (musician) (1963–2016), American keyboardist and guitarist
Paul A. Gordon (1930–2009), Seventh-day Adventist and former director of the Ellen G. White Estate

See also
Paul Gordan (1837–1912), German mathematician